Hugh Byrne (born 5 July 1939) is a former Fine Gael politician from Dublin, Ireland. He was a Teachta Dála (TD) for 13 years.

He was elected to Dáil Éireann on his first attempt, at the 1969 general election, when he won a seat in the 19th Dáil as a TD for the Dublin North-West constituency. He held his seat at the 1973 general election, and after boundary changes for the 1977 general election he was re-elected for the new Dublin Cabra seat. When that constituency was abolished for the 1981 general election, he was returned for a new Dublin North-West constituency.

After Garret FitzGerald's Fine Gael–Labour Party coalition government fell in January 1982, Byrne lost his seat at the resulting February 1982 general election, to Proinsias De Rossa of Sinn Féin the Workers Party. After failing to regain his seat at the November 1982 general election, he did not stand again.

References

1939 births
Living people
Fine Gael TDs
Members of the 19th Dáil
Members of the 20th Dáil
Members of the 21st Dáil
Members of the 22nd Dáil